The Paranapiacaba Conservation Units Mosaic is a protected area mosaic in the state of São Paulo, Brazil. It is administered by the state, and protects a large area of Atlantic Forest. It is associated with the Paranapiacaba Ecological Corridor of the Atlantic Forest Biosphere Reserve.

Formation

In 1995 the area covered by Paranapiacaba Mosaic was declared part of the Atlantic Forest Biosphere Reserve by UNESCO, and in 2000 it was declared a natural World Heritage Site.
The TCCA/FF Paranapiacaba Mosaic Project was approved by the Environmental Compensation Chamber and launched in September 2011 to define the scope, schedule, synergies and integrated management of the mosaic.

São Paulo state decree 58.148 of 21 June 2012 created the Nascentes do Paranapanema state park and the Paranapiacaba Conservation Units Mosaic.
The mosaic consisted of the  Alto Ribeira Tourist State Park, Intervales State Park, Carlos Botelho State Park, Xitué Ecological Station, Nascentes do Paranapanema State Park and the Serra do Mar Environmental Protection Area in the municipalities of Eldorado, Sete Barras, Tapiraí, Juquiá, Ribeirão Grande and Capão Bonito.
The purpose was to promote integrated and participatory management of the conservation units, and to seek to guarantee conservation of the areas covered.
Additional units could be later added to the mosaic by decree.
The Secretariat for the Environment had 180 days to constitute the mosaic, and was to provide the material, human and financial resources needed.

Extent

The Intervales State Park forms the central region of the mosaic.
Other conservation units in the mosaic are the Carlos Botelho, Alto Ribeira Tourist, Nascentes do Paranapanema and Caverna do Diabo state parks, Xitué Ecological Station, Serra do Mar Environmental Protection Area and Quilombos do Médio Ribeira Environmental Protection Area.

The forest of the Nascentes do Paranapanema park is extremely well preserved, and is home to the largest population of jaguars (Panthera onca) in the Atlantic Forest.
It includes other threatened species such as cougar (Puma concolor), South American tapir (Tapirus terrestris), bush dog (Speothos venaticus), pygmy brocket (Mazama nana) and southern muriqui (Brachyteles arachnoides).
The connection between the various areas in the Paranapiacaba mosaic will help the species to survive.
The jaguar tends to avoid areas frequented by man, including areas used by hunters and gatherers of heart of palm.
It is estimated that there are just 250 individual jaguars in the states of Paraná, São Paulo and Rio de Janeiro, most of them in the mosaic area.

Ecological corridor

The Paranapiacaba Ecological Corridor, also called the Paranapiacaba Continuum, is part of the Tombamento da Serra do Mar, established by resolution CONDEPHAAT 40/1995, and the Atlantic Forest Biosphere Reserve, created by UNESCO in 1991 and recognized in 1999 as a World Heritage Site.
As of 2012 the Atlantic Forest Biosphere Reserve (RBMA) "Sources, Caves and Ecotones" project aimed to create and expand conservation units in the Paranapiacaba Ecological Corridor, a unique area for biodiversity conservation, with the largest remaining fragment of Atlantic Forest.
The corridor is composed of the Carlos Botelho, Intervales and Alto Ribeira Tourist state parks, the Xitué Ecological Station and the Serra do Mar and Quilombos do Meio Ribeira
environmental protection areas.

Notes

Sources

Protected area mosaics of Brazil
Protected areas established in 2011
2011 establishments in Brazil
Protected areas of São Paulo (state)